Moro de guandules (Moorish pigeon peas) is a dish from the Dominican Republic served on holidays.

The dish is typically cooked with long-grain rice, celery, bell peppers, red onion, garlic, oregano, thyme, cilantro, tomato paste, chicken bouillon, and occasionally olives and capers.

When coconut milk is added it is known as moro de guandules con coco. The dish is of Samaná, Dominican Republic origin where coconut milk is highly used in many traditional dishes. The dish is mild and flavorful. It is typically paired with roasted meat.

See also
 Arroz con pollo - Rice, chicken, and peas dish
 Arroz con gandules - Puerto Rican one pot yellow-rice, pork, and pigeon pea dish
 Platillo Moros y Cristianos - Cuban one pot black bean and rice
 Gallo pinto
 Pabellón criollo
 Rice and beans
 Rice and peas - Jamaican one pot coconut milk, rice, salted pork, and pigeon pea dish

References

Dominican Republic cuisine
Legume dishes
Latin American rice dishes